Dharmendra Kumar Singh Shakya is an Indian politician and a member of 17th Legislative Assembly, Uttar Pradesh of India. He represents the ‘Shekhupur’ constituency in Budaun district of Uttar Pradesh.

Political career
Dharmendra Kumar Singh Shakya contested Uttar Pradesh Assembly Election as Bharatiya Janata Party candidate and defeated his close contestant Ashish Yadav from Samajwadi Party with a margin of 5386 votes.

Posts held

References

Year of birth missing (living people)
Living people
Uttar Pradesh MLAs 2017–2022
Bharatiya Janata Party politicians from Uttar Pradesh
People from Budaun district